Hyogong of Silla (883–912) (r. 897–912) was the 52nd ruler of the Korean kingdom of Silla.  He was the illegitimate son of King Heongang by Lady Uimyeong.  He married the daughter of Ichan Ugyeom.  His reign saw the expansion of Later Three Kingdoms powers Taebong and Hubaekje across what had once been the western marches of Unified Silla.

During his reign, the situation of Silla was that Gung Ye and Gyeon Hwon, who took place in the provinces, were fighting for supremacy.

In 905, Silla lost its holdings to the northeast of Jungnyeong pass. In 907, Gyeon Hwon's Hubaekje forces seized ten castles to the south of Ilseon. Faced with these defeats, the king turned to drink and neglected state affairs.  Upon his death in 912, he was buried to the north of Sajasa temple.

Family 
Parents
 Father: Heongang of Silla
 Grandfather: Gyeongmun of Silla
Grandmother: Queen Munui of the Kim clan (문의왕후 김씨)
 Mother: Queen Uimyeong (의명부인), of the Kim clan (의명왕후 김씨)
Consortsand their respective issue:
 Queen Park, of the Park clan (왕비 박씨), –was the daughter of Park Ye–gyeom (박예겸) and the sister of Sindeok of Silla

Media 

 Portrayed by Han Geun-Ok 《Taejo Wang Geon (TV series)》 (kbs, 2000~2002년),

See also 
List of Korean monarchs
List of Silla people
Later Three Kingdoms of Korea

References

Silla rulers
883 births
912 deaths
10th-century rulers in Asia
Year of birth unknown